Miller's Hill, Milborne Wick is a  geological Site of Special Scientific Interest at Milborne Wick in Somerset, notified in 1985.

Miller's Hill is an important and historically famous locality for studies of Middle Jurassic (Bajocian) stratigraphy and palaeontology.

References
 English Nature citation sheet for the site (accessed 10 August 2006)

External links
 English Nature website (SSSI information)

Sites of Special Scientific Interest in Somerset
Sites of Special Scientific Interest notified in 1985
Geology of Somerset